Samadi Pronounced "Suh-mah-dee" is used as a surname in people descending from the Middle East and Central Asia. The name is over 4000 years old originating from the Old Avestan language of early Persians and later branching in to the Jewish and more recently Muslim names. The meaning in all cultures have similarities, which translates to: Enlightened, Chosen, and/or Unique. Muslim faith refers to one of the 99 ways of describing God as Samad.

Notable people with the name include:

David Samadi (born 1964), Persian world renowned urologist 
Michael Samadi (born 1970), Lebanese American entrepreneur 
Ash Samadi (born 1969), Persian entrepreneur and race car driver
Mahnaz Samadi, Iranian dissident and human rights activist
Mohamed Samadi  (born 1970), Moroccan soccer player
Salah Samadi (born 1976), Algerian soccer player
Saman Samadi (born 1984), Persian avant-garde composer and improvising performer residing in NYC
Yalda Samadi (born 1990), Iranian pianist